Hawle Wadag District is a district in the central Banaadir region of Somalia. A neighborhood in north-central Mogadishu, the Bakaara Market is located here.

In 2009 this region was an operation base by Al-Shabaab who harassed or attacked Amisom from here whose defensive line was at the Sayyid Hassan statue site. This statue featured the Sayyid positioned on the Hiin Faniin, a Suleiman horse.

References

External links
Districts of Somalia
Administrative map of Hawle-Wadag District

Districts of Somalia
Banaadir